Rachel Ann Mullins is an American model, actress, and producer. Mullins was uncredited for her role as Sam on ABC's Happy Endings (2012).

Mullins has acted in several television shows, including The Finder (2012), Don't Trust the B---- in Apartment 23 (2013), Sequestered (2014), CSI: NY (2011), Secret Lives of Women (2009) and as Debbie on Betas (2013). She has also appeared in numerous films, including Entourage (2015).

Filmography

Film

Television

References

External links
 
 

American television actresses
American female models
American women screenwriters
Living people
1988 births
Place of birth missing (living people)
21st-century American women